In 1801, the territory that would later become Argentina was part of the Viceroyalty of the Río de la Plata, part of the Spanish Empire.

Events

Births
 October 18 - Justo José de Urquiza – general and politician (d. 1870)

Deaths

References

 
Years in Argentina
Years of the 19th century in Argentina